Stigmella purpuratella is a moth of the family Nepticulidae. It is found in Pennsylvania, United States.

The wingspan is 4.2-4.4 mm.

The immature stages and host plants are unknown.

External links
Nepticulidae of North America
A taxonomic revision of the North American species of Stigmella (Lepidoptera: Nepticulidae)

Nepticulidae
Moths of North America
Moths described in 1917